Eroica is a BBC television film that dramatises the first performance of  Beethoven's third symphony, the Eroica.  It carries the tagline 'The day that changed music forever'.

The film was directed by Simon Cellan Jones, written by Nick Dear and starred Ian Hart, Tim Pigott-Smith, Anton Lesser and Frank Finlay. The music was played by Orchestre Révolutionnaire et Romantique and conducted by Sir John Eliot Gardiner. It won the Prix Italia for Performing Arts in 2004.

Plot
The film is set in Vienna on 9 June 1804, the date of the private, first performance of Beethoven's third symphony, later to be known as the 'Eroica'. The performance, and most of the action in the film, takes place at the palace of one of Beethoven's patrons, Prince Franz Lobkowitz. Midway during the performance, Beethoven tries to get his lover, a widow named Josephine von Deym, to marry him, but she refuses because of the unfair laws regarding child custody – she is a member of the nobility, and cannot marry a commoner without losing custody of her children. Later, composer Joseph Haydn, now old and feeble, arrives just in time to hear the last movement of the symphony.

During the last few minutes of the symphony, the film flashes forward, and we see Beethoven going to dinner with his pupil, Ferdinand Ries, where he is told that Napoleon has just declared himself Emperor of France, thereby completely betraying Beethoven's faith in him. In a rage, he crumples up the title page of his symphony, which he originally intended to call the "Bonaparte".  As he leaves the performance, Haydn is asked his opinion of the symphony, which he describes as "quite new", and then utters his now-famous and prophetic comment, "From this day forward, everything [in music] is changed". The film ends on a grim note; as the performance of the Eroica ends, Beethoven looks at his audience and is momentarily unable to hear any natural sounds – an ominous sign of his approaching deafness.

Cast
 Ian Hart as Ludwig van Beethoven
 Tim Pigott-Smith as Count Dietrichstein
 Jack Davenport as Prince Franz Lobkowitz
 Fenella Woolgar as Princess Marie Lobkowitz
 Claire Skinner as Countess Josephine von Deym
 Lucy Akhurst as Countess Teresa von Brunswick (Josephine's sister)
 Frank Finlay as Joseph Haydn
 Leo Bill as Ferdinand Ries 
 Peter Hanson as Wranitzky (leader of the orchestra in the film, and of Orchestre Révolutionnaire et Romantique)
 Robert Glenister as Gerhardt (one of the prince's servants)
 Anton Lesser as Sukowaty (Beethoven's copyist).

Soundtrack
Eine Kleine Nachtmusik
(excerpt) by Wolfgang Amadeus Mozart

Symphony No. 3 (Beethoven)
by Ludwig van Beethoven

References
.

External links

Musical films based on actual events
Depictions of Ludwig van Beethoven on film
British biographical films
Prix Italia winners
2003 films
Films directed by Simon Cellan Jones
2000s English-language films
2000s British films